Audie & the Wolf is a 2008 American comedy horror film directed by Brian S. O'Malley and starring Christa Campbell, Rance Howard and Richard Riehle.

Plot

Cast
Christa Campbell as Rachel Brock
Derek Hughes as John Doe
Rance Howard as Dr. Maleosis
Richard Riehle as Michael Ludlow
Tara Price as Audie Bantam

References

External links
 
 

American comedy horror films
2000s English-language films
2000s American films